Bohemia Township may refer to:
Bohemia Township, Michigan
Bohemia Township, Knox County, Nebraska
Bohemia Township, Saunders County, Nebraska

Township name disambiguation pages